Bathalaa as a place name may refer to:
 Bathalaa (Alif Alif Atoll) (Republic of Maldives)
 Bathalaa (Baa Atoll) (Republic of Maldives)